Lirophora paphia is a species of bivalve belonging to the family Veneridae.

The species is found in America and the Atlantic.

References

Veneridae